The Nadeș gas field is a natural gas field located in Nadeș, Mureș County. It was discovered in 1915 and developed by and Romgaz. It began production in 1930 and produces natural gas and condensates. The total proven reserves of the Nadeș gas field are around 355 billion cubic feet (10 km³), and production is slated to be around 17.5 million cubic feet/day (0.5×105m³) in 2010.

References

Natural gas fields in Romania